Rustam Garifoullin (20 May 1978 – 23 February 2015) was a disabled Russian cross-country skier and biathlete. He received two gold medals in Biathlon at the 2006 Winter Paralympics. He also won a silver medal in cross-country skiing in the 1x3.75/2x5 km relay at that Paralympics.

He died from a car accident on 23 February 2015.

References

External links 
 

1978 births
2015 deaths
Russian male biathletes
Paralympic biathletes of Russia
Paralympic cross-country skiers of Russia
Paralympic gold medalists for Russia
Paralympic silver medalists for Russia
Paralympic medalists in cross-country skiing
Paralympic medalists in biathlon
Biathletes at the 2006 Winter Paralympics
Cross-country skiers at the 2006 Winter Paralympics
Medalists at the 2006 Winter Paralympics